Bride of the Wind is a 2001 period drama directed by Academy Award-nominee Bruce Beresford and written by first-time screenwriter Marilyn Levy. Loosely based on the life of Alma Mahler, Bride of the Wind recounts Alma's marriage to the composer Gustav Mahler and her romantic liaisons. The title of the film alludes to a painting by Oskar Kokoschka named Die Windsbraut, literally meaning The Bride of the Wind, though often translated as The Tempest. The artist dedicated this painting to Alma Mahler.

The film received negative reviews from critics and did poorly at the box office.

Poster Art
The film poster artwork depicts Alma reclining on a chaise longue attended by a lover, with a field of flowers in the background.  Alma's dress, her hair, the chaise, the field of flowers and even the air are replete with many of the stylistic elements of paintings by Gustav Klimt.

Cast
 Sarah Wynter as Alma Mahler
 Jonathan Pryce as Gustav Mahler
 Vincent Perez as Oskar Kokoschka
 Simon Verhoeven as Walter Gropius
 Gregor Seberg as Franz Werfel
 Dagmar Schwarz as Anna Sofie Schindler-Moll
 Wolfgang Hübsch as Carl Moll
 August Schmölzer as Gustav Klimt
 Johannes Silberschneider as Alexander von Zemlinsky
 Hans Steunzer as Richard Strauss
 Robert Herzl as Arnold Schoenberg

Reception
On Rotten Tomatoes the film has an approval rating of 11% based on reviews from 64 critics. On Metacritic the film has a score of 35% based on reviews from 26 critics, indicating "generally unfavorable reviews".

References

External links
 
 

2001 films
2001 biographical drama films
2001 romantic drama films
British biographical drama films
British romantic drama films
American biographical drama films
American romantic drama films
German romantic drama films
Austrian romantic drama films
English-language Austrian films
English-language German films
Films about classical music and musicians
Films about composers
Drama films based on actual events
Films set in the 1900s
Films set in the 1910s
Films set in Vienna
Films directed by Bruce Beresford
Paramount Vantage films
Adultery in films
Gustav Mahler
Gustav Klimt
Walter Gropius
2000s English-language films
2000s American films
2000s British films
2000s German films